The 1988 Omloop Het Volk was the 42nd edition of the Omloop Het Volk cycle race and was held on 5 March 1988. The race started and finished in Sint-Amandsberg. The race was won by Ronny Van Holen.

General classification

References

1988
Omloop Het Nieuwsblad
Omloop Het Nieuwsblad
Omloop Het Volk